Perego may refer to:

People
Notable people with this surname include:
 Andrea Perego, Italo-Australian journalist and writer
 Didi Perego, Italian actress 
 Ettore Perego, Italian gymnast
 Eugenio Perego, Italian film director
 Gaetano Perego, Italian painter
 Giuseppe Perego, Italian comic artist
 Jeanne Perego, Italian writer and journalist
 Mark Perego, Welsh rugby player
 Paola Perego, Italian television host
 Ugo A. Perego, Italian geneticist

Places
 Perego, Lecco, Italy

Other
 Peg Perego, Italian manufacturer of juvenile products